The Mitsubishi 3G8 engine is a range of three-cylinder powerplant from Mitsubishi Motors, introduced in the fifth generation of their Mitsubishi Minica kei car. In common with other contemporary engines in the class, it could be specified with many advanced technologies despite its diminutive size, including multi-valve cylinder heads and double overhead camshafts. The top-of-the-line Dangan ZZ variant was also the first kei car to benefit from turbocharging. In 1987 Mitsubishi was the first manufacturer to supercharge a kei vehicle, and in 1989 became the world's first production car to feature five valves per cylinder, ahead of similar developments by Bugatti, Audi, Ferrari and Toyota.

The valves are controlled by twin overhead camshafts through roller cam followers on finger rockers with hydraulic automatic lash adjusters. Gasoline is electronically injected through triple-jet nozzles (also a technological first). The water-cooled turbocharger operates through an air-to-air intercooler. The ignition timing advance is also controlled electronically, and a knock-sensing system is included.

The four-cylinder 4A3 engine is derived from the 3G8, sharing a  bore pitch.

3G81

Engine dimensions —  inline three-cylinder
Bore — 
Stroke — 
Fuel type — Unleaded regular gasoline

Versions

3G82

Displacement — 
Bore — 
Stroke — 
Engine type — Inline three-cylinder SOHC 6 valves
Power —  at unknown rpm

This was built only for the Taiwanese market Mitsubishi Towny (Minica) and Minicab 800, from 01.87 - 11.88. Most specifications are unknown.

3G83
Displacement — 
Bore — 
Stroke — 
Fuel type — Unleaded regular gasoline

Double carb (1990)
Engine type — Inline three-cylinder SOHC
Power —  at 6000 rpm
Torque —  at 4000 rpm
Fuel system — two-barrel down-draft carburettor
Compression ratio — 9.8:1

DOHC (1990)
Engine type — Inline three-cylinder DOHC
Compression ratio — 9.8:4
Fuel system — ECI multiple
Power —  at 7500 rpm
Torque —  at 5700 rpm

Turbo (1990)
Engine type — Inline three-cylinder DOHC 15-valve intercooled turbo
Compression ratio — 8.5:1
Fuel system — ECI multiple
Power —  at 7,500 rpm
Torque —  at 4,500 rpm

4G82

Displacement — 
Bore — 
Stroke — 
Engine type — Inline four-cylinder SOHC
Power —  JIS at 5,500 rpm 
Torque —  at 3,500 rpm

Of the same dimensions as the 3G82 but with a fourth cylinder, this was built in Taiwan by CMC (China Motor Corporation). Used in the Mitsubishi Varica (LWB version of fourth generation Mitsubishi Minicab).

See also

 List of Mitsubishi engines

References

3G8
Straight-three engines
Gasoline engines by model